Alta Córdoba is a railway station located in the Alta Córdoba neighborhood of Córdoba in the province of the same name, Argentina. The station is terminus of the Tren de las Sierras service operated by state-owned Trenes Argentinos. Likewise, another state company, Trenes Argentinos Cargas y Logística, operates freight services there.

History 

The station was originally built by the Córdoba Central Railway that operated a line between provinces of Córdoba and Santa Fe, opening the first section in 1888. In 1938, the Córdoba Central Railway (with some financial problems) was taken over by the Argentine state, being added to the Central Northern Railway network. 

When the Juan Perón's administration nationalised the whole railway network in 1948, the Central Northern Railway (and therefore the Alta Córdoba station) became part of General Belgrano Railway, one of the six divisions of recently formed Ferrocarriles Argentinos.

By the 1960s the line had its golden age when it carried a big number of passengers from Valle de Punilla, as well as tourists coming from the cities of Córdoba, Rosario and Buenos Aires at attractive prices. Nevertheless, the Córdoba-Cruz del Eje line was closed in 1977. When the Government of Argentina led by Carlos Menem privatized all the railway lines in the early 1990s, the Córdoba-Cruz del Eje line was transferred to Córdoba Province. The Government of Córdoba stated that they could not finance the service.

As part of a national railway privatisation plan, carried out under the presidency of Carlos Menem, a concession to operate the line was granted to local consortium Grupo Alcázar, which operated the line (also naming it Tren de las Sierras) from Córdoba to Capilla del Monte (100-km length) but services suddenly stopped in 2001. Three years later the Government of Córdoba revoked the contract of concession (by Provincial Decree n° 1274) blaming the concessionary for the bad conditions of the service and poor maintenance.

Private consortium Ferrocentral granted concession to operate the line, starting in 2004. In 2007 the Province transferred the line to the National Government. On August 10, 2007, the service was partially re-opened, only between the cities of Rodríguez del Busto and La Calera.

On June 22, 2009, Alta Córdoba was set up as terminus, but the concessionary decided to move terminus to Rodríguez del Busto due to people from poor neighborhoods around the station used to throw stones to the trains. In March 2015, this section of the railway was re-opened by the Minister of the Interior and Transport, Florencio Randazzo

With Alta Córdoba station virtually abandoned, the Municipality of Córdoba requested the National Government permission to move the City Council to the station building.

In September 2013 state-owned company Trenes Argentinos took over the Tren de las Sierras. In March 2015, Alta Córdoba was set up as terminus again.

Operators 

Notes

See also
 Tren de las Sierras

References

Railway stations in Argentina
Railway stations opened in 1891
a